APHRODITE-2 is a submarine telecommunications cable system in the Mediterranean Sea linking Greece and Cyprus.

It has landing points in:
 Chania, Greece
 Geroskipou/Yeroskipos, Cyprus

It has a design transmission capacity of 2 x 565 Mbit/s and a total cable length of 868 km.  It started operation on 30 September 1994.

Sources
 

Submarine communications cables in the Mediterranean Sea
Communications in Greece
Communications in Cyprus
Cyprus–Greece relations
1994 establishments in Cyprus
1994 establishments in Greece